is a samurai warrior's quest or pilgrimage. The concept is similar to the Chinese Youxia, or Knight Errantry in feudal Europe. A warrior, called a shugyōsha, would wander the land practicing and honing his skills without the protection of his family or school. Possible activities include training with other schools, dueling, performing bodyguard or mercenary work, and searching for a daimyō to serve.

Musha shugyō ("training in warriorship") was inspired by Zen monks, who would engage in similar ascetic wanderings (which they called angya, "travelling on foot") before attaining enlightenment.

Notes

Japanese martial arts terminology
Samurai